CKOD-FM is a French language Canadian radio station located in Salaberry-de-Valleyfield, Quebec, approximately 50 kilometres (30 miles) southwest of Montreal, Quebec, Canada.

The station is owned by Torres Media, a company that owns two other radio stations namely, CIUX 105.5 Hits FM in Uxbridge, Ontario and CIDG Rebel 101.7, in Ottawa. The station broadcasts on 103.1 MHz with an effective radiated power of 3,000 watts (class A) using an omnidirectional antenna.

The station was acquired from Radio Express by Torres Media Valleyfield in 2015.

The station music is a contemporary hits format and is branded as 103.1 MAX FM.  The announcer line-up features Yves Trottier and Mylene Lepage in the morning, afternoon host Elise Deschenes and evening host Carl Colin. Former NHL star Yvon Lambert provides regular sports analysis

Known as CFLV until 1991, the station was on the AM band 1370 kHz from 1961 to 1994, at which point the station moved to FM band on 102.9 MHz. However, strong interference by CITE-FM-1 in Sherbrooke, which broadcasts on the neighbouring frequency of 102.7 MHz from Mount Orford (approximately 170 kilometres, 105 miles east) forced a change to the current 103.1 MHz very shortly after the initial move to FM.

References

External links
 Max 103.1 FM
CKOD-FM Salaberry-de-Valleyfield - Acquisition of assets
License Renewal, 2016
 

Kod
Kod
Kod
Salaberry-de-Valleyfield
Radio stations established in 1961
1961 establishments in Quebec